Texas is a 2010 Lasse Stefanz studio album. For the fourth year in a row, the band topped the Swedish albums chart. For the album, the band was also awarded a Grammis Award in the "Dansband of the Year" category.

On 12 June 2011, the song "Skåneland" entered Svensktoppen. but was knocked out the upcoming week.

Track listing
Skåneland
Himlen gråter för dig
Ännu blommar våra rosor (Good Year for the Roses)
Vita stränder
Hus, hund och en man
Du sa farväl
Allt är förlorat
Fredagskväll (with  Anne Nørdsti)
Blue Eyes Crying in the Rain
En Sista Tequila
Ring bara ring
Kärleken är allt
Copacabana
Shake a Hand (with Jerry Williams)

Charts

Certifications

References 

2010 albums
Lasse Stefanz albums